Year of Revolutions may refer to:

Revolutions of 1830
Revolutions of 1848, often cited as The Year of Revolutions
Protests of 1968
Revolutions of 1989 and the fall of communism
Arab Spring